Operation Nasr-4 was an Iranian military operation from May to June 1987 which threatened the Iraqi city of Kirkuk during the Iran–Iraq War. The operation took place in February 1987 after Iran's Operation Karbala-5, which was an effort to capture the city of Basra in southern Iraq.

See also
 Operation Nasr

References

20th century in Iraqi Kurdistan
Nasr
Nasr